Perotis rara is a species of grass in the family, Poaceae, first described by Robert Brown in 1810. It is native to Australia,  South-east China, Malaya, New Guinea, the Philippines, Taiwan, Thailand, and Vietnam.

References

Chloridoideae